"Where I Ought to Be" is a song written by Harlan Howard. In 1961, Skeeter Davis recorded and released the song as a single for RCA Victor in 1962.

"Where I Ought to Be" was recorded on November 1, 1961, at the RCA Victor Studio in Nashville, Tennessee, United States. The song was released as a single in January 1962, and it peaked at number nine on the Billboard Magazine Hot C&W Sides chart later that year. The single became Davis' fifth top-ten hit on the country chart at that point. The song was not originally issued onto an official album.

Chart performance

References 

1961 songs
Skeeter Davis songs
Songs written by Harlan Howard
Song recordings produced by Chet Atkins
1962 singles
RCA Victor singles